Michael John James George Robert Howard, 21st Earl of Suffolk & 14th Earl of Berkshire (27 March 1935 – 5 August 2022), styled Viscount Andover until 1941, was an English peer, a member of the House of Lords from 1956 to 1999.

Life
Michael Howard was born on 27 March 1935, the son of Charles Howard, 20th Earl of Suffolk, and Chicago-born ballet dancer Mimi Forde Pigott. 

He succeeded his father in 1941, when his father was killed by a bomb he was attempting to defuse. 

He was briefly educated at Winchester College, but left after a year.

After his death, the writer Jilly Cooper revealed that Suffolk had been one of the inspirations for her best-known literary creation, Rupert Campbell-Black.

Personal life
Suffolk was married three times:
He married, firstly, on 1 October 1960, Simone Litman, by whom he had one daughter:
 Lady Lucinda Howard (26 March 1961 – 21 December 1962)

On 22 September 1973, Suffolk married Anita Fugelsang (who later married Charles Stanhope, 12th Earl of Harrington), with whom he had two children:
 Alexander Charles Michael Winston Robsahm Howard, 22nd Earl of Suffolk (b. 17 September 1974); divorced from Victoria (née Hamilton) 
 Lady Eloise Victoria Rose Mimi Howard (b. 1 May 2013)
 Arthur Charles Alexander Howard, Viscount Andover (b. 17 July 2014)
 Lady Katharine Emma Frances Robsahm Howard (b. 1976) married to William Rogers
 Lara Rose Rogers (born 2010)
 Jake Mickey Rogers (born 2014)

On 15 December 1983, Suffolk married the former Linda Jacqueline Paravicini (married, firstly, Alexander Hood, 4th Viscount Bridport), with whom he had two children:
 Lady Philippa Mimi Jacqueline Henrietta Howard (b. 1985) married Archie Lord in 2017. They have one daughter:
 Ottilie Winifred Lord (16 November 2018)
 Lady Natasha Rose Catherine Linda Howard (b. 1987). married Charles Quick in March 2022.

The Earl of Suffolk lived at Charlton Park, Wiltshire. He was also 14th Earl of Berkshire, but signed in the name of 'Suffolk', his most senior title. He died on 5 August 2022, at the age of 87.

Family tree

References

External links

Michael Howard, 21st Earl of Suffolk

1935 births
2022 deaths
Michael
Michael
Michael John
People from Wiltshire
People educated at Winchester College
English people of American descent

Suffolk